John Strangways may refer to:

 John Strangways (died 1676) (1636–1676), English politician
 John Strangways (died 1666) (1585–1666), English politician

See also
 John Strangways, a fictional character in the James Bond series
 John Fox-Strangways (1803–1859), British diplomat, Whig politician and courtier